Stenanthemum complicatum is a species of flowering plant in the family Rhamnaceae and is endemic to the southwest of Western Australia. It is a woody, erect or straggling shrub with densely hairy young stems, broadly egg-shaped leaves and densely woolly-hairy heads of tube-shaped flowers.

Description
The upper surface of the leaves is covered with greyish, velvety hairs and the lower surface is densely covered with greyish or rust-covered hairs.

Taxonomy and naming
This species was first formally described in 1862 by Ferdinand von Mueller who gave it the name Spyridium complicatum in Fragmenta Phytographiae Australiae from specimens collected by Augustus Oldfield near the Murchison River. In 1995, Barbara Lynette Rye changed the name to Stenanthemum complicatum in the journal Nuytsia. The specific epithet (complicatum) means "folded upon itself", referring to the leaves.

Distribution and habitat
Stenanthemum complicatum grows on sandplains from Shark Bay to Mullewa in the Carnarvon, Geraldton Sandplains and Yalgoo bioregions of south-western Western Australia.

References

complicatum
Rosales of Australia
Flora of Western Australia
Plants described in 1862
Taxa named by Ferdinand von Mueller